Haig Bodden Stadium is a football facility located in Bodden Town, Cayman Islands. The complex contains a football pitch, and two basketball courts. The main tenant is Bodden Town FC. The capacity is 1,500.

References

Football venues in the Cayman Islands
Buildings and structures in the Cayman Islands